The 1960–61 British Home Championship international football tournament saw a series of high scoring games, with 40 goals scored in just six matches - a ratio of 6.66 goals per game. England took the British title after a final match at Wembley in which they put nine goals past Scotland, who returned with three of their own.  Teams in this period frequently fielded as many as five strikers, hoping to outscore opponents rather than rely on heavy defence. This tactic paid dividends, particularly for England, whose haul of 19 included seven for Jimmy Greaves, whilst both Bobby Charlton and Bobby Smith each scored in each of England's three games.

England had begun the tournament well, winning 5–2 against Ireland in Belfast, whilst the Welsh beat a tough Scottish side at home. Welsh hopes of tournament success were disabused in their second match, where England took them apart 5–1, whilst the Irish were again on the reverse of a heavy defeat, losing 5–2 in Glasgow against Scotland. In the tournament's final games, Wales beat Ireland 5–1 to claim second spot, leading to England and Scotland's dramatic finale.

Players at the tournament included a medley of stars from the 1950s, and young players who would take the 1960s by storm. This line-up included Danny Blanchflower and Peter McParland for Ireland, Ivor Allchurch and John Charles for Wales, Denis Law and Dave Mackay for Scotland and an England team including Bobby Charlton, Johnny Haynes, Jimmy Greaves and Bobby Robson, some of whom would later win the 1966 FIFA World Cup.

Table

Results

References

1960-61
1960–61 in Northern Ireland association football
1960–61 in English football
1960–61 in Scottish football
1960–61 in Welsh football
1960 in British sport
1961 in British sport